S-adenosyl-L-methionine:bergaptol O-methyltransferase may refer to:

 5-hydroxyfuranocoumarin 5-O-methyltransferase
 Bergaptol O-methyltransferase